Sagarmatha Airport is an airport under construction in Province No. 1 of Nepal. The proposal is to build an airport in Jogidaha, Gaighat in Udayapur District. The proposed airport was scheduled to be completed within three years and set to open in December  2022. The runway is planned to be 60m x 2000 m.

Development

The concept of constructing an airport in Udayapur District was first developed in 1974, however was not developed on until 2019.

13,637 trees in the area would have to been cut down, as Civil Aviation Authority of Nepal has allocated Rs 6.5 million for the construction of the airport in the current fiscal year.

70% of the trees in the area has been cut until November 2022.

See also

 List of airports in Nepal

References

Further
Udayapur revives airport plan
Constructing Sagarmatha Airport (in Nepali)

Airports in Nepal
Buildings and structures in Udayapur District